Kaiser Steel was a steel mill near Fontana, California, founded by Henry J. Kaiser on December 1, 1941. The plant's first blast furnace, "Bess No. 1" (named after Kaiser's wife) was fired up on December 30, 1942, and the first steel plate was produced in August 1943 for the Pacific Coast shipbuilding industry amid World War II. The facility was fully integrated, taking ore and producing steel at a single site, the only such steel plant on the West Coast. The Fontana facility produced about 75 million tons of steel over its history.

The mill was part of Kaiser's vertically-integrated business: iron ore was supplied by Kaiser's mine in Eagle Mountain, California using Kaiser's Eagle Mountain Railroad, coal was supplied by Kaiser's mines in New Mexico and Utah and limestone was from a Kaiser mine in Cushenbury, California, the steel produced was used by the Kaiser Shipyards and other Kaiser owned businesses (among other customers), and the Kaiser Permanente health maintenance organization was established to care for the workers at all the locations.

During World War II, much of the plant's output was used up by the seven Kaiser Shipyards and the California Shipbuilding Corporation (which Kaiser had an interest in), which built hundreds of Liberty ships and Victory ships during World War II.

Kaiser Steel was noted for making the most of its costly steelmaking inputs, and it captured, along with the U.S. Steel plant in Geneva, Utah, much of the Pacific Coast steel market by the 1950s. Over time, the plant's production would shrink, expand again during the Korean War, then shrink again, before Kaiser closed the mill in December 1983. A large portion of the land in Fontana was sold to create the California Speedway (now called the Auto Club Speedway), although a small portion of the steelmaking plant remains, now operated by California Steel Industries.

History 
The Kaiser Steel Corporation was incorporated on December 1, 1941, for the purpose of manufacturing steel in Southern California. The finished steel was needed to supply the various shipbuilding facilities controlled by Henry J. Kaiser on the west coast. These facilities were building ships for the British government and were using costly eastern steel that was in short supply. In August 1943, the first plate steel rolled off the production line.

Coal for this early production came from Utah Fuel Company Mine No. 2 at Sunnyside, Utah. In 1950, Kaiser Steel purchased the entire Sunnyside, Utah facility. In 1955, Kaiser purchased  of land near Raton, New Mexico, for future expanded coal production. The existing mine in Raton, named the Koehler Mine, was operated and upgraded until the newer and more modern York Canyon Mine was completed nearby. The York Canyon Mine served as the major source of coking coal until the plant closed.

Also needed for the production of steel was limestone. Until 1955, this material was purchased from various sources in California and Nevada. In that year Kaiser Steel purchased a large deposit located in Cushenbury, California, only  from Fontana.

The last ingredient needed for the steelmaking process was a reliable source of iron ore.  Kaiser Steel purchased the Vulcan Mine located near Kelso, California, which served as the primary source of ore until 1948. This ore, however, was not of good enough quality to satisfy Kaiser and a better source was sought. In 1944, Kaiser Steel purchased the large Eagle Mountain mining claim from the Southern Pacific Railroad and began the development of the Eagle Mountain Mine after the end of World War II.

Kaiser Steel was noted for making the most of its costly steelmaking inputs, and it captured, along with the U.S. Steel plant in Geneva, Utah, much of the Pacific Coast steel market by the 1950s.

But from the beginning, the plant had to deal with two major hardships: its location ( inland, a wartime concession to fears of coastal attacks) and size (restricted to wartime needs by government lenders).

Over time, the plant's production would shrink, expand again during the Korean War, then shrink again in the 1970s, in part because of competition from low-cost Japanese and Korean steelmakers, who were accused of dumping steel at prices below cost in the Western United States.

In the early 1970s, Kaiser contemplated getting out of manufacturing basic steel slabs, but in 1975 the company reversed course, and instead spent  (US$ in  dollars) to modernize the facility. When the new mill went online in 1979, it was capable of producing 2.3 million tons of high-grade carbon steel a year. But the new plant couldn't hold off the international competition, environmental regulations, labor disputes and corporate raiders. In December 1983, the mill was shuttered as part of the general termination of Kaiser's steel business.

Land reuse 

The site and plant were briefly owned by an investor group that purchased much of Kaiser's assets before they were sold to a Kaiser creditor, Brazilian firm Companhia Vale do Rio Doce (now Vale).

California Steel would only operate the portion of the plant that where they could process imported steel slabs into finished products such as rolled steel. The manufacturing equipment for producing raw steel, installed in 1979, would remain idle. Shougang would also spend  (US$ in  dollars) to dismantle the equipment, ship it to southern China, and reassemble as one of that country's most advanced steel mills.

After Vale's debt was forgiven, the remaining assets of Kaiser Steel were reorganized into a company called Kaiser Ventures in 1988. In 1990, the company leased the plant's water rights to the Cucamonga County Water District, which provides municipal water in the western portion of San Bernardino County. The ongoing payments allowed the new company to stay in business. The company demolished the remaining plant, which was built with more steel per square foot than any other building in the country and sell the metal for scrap. In 1995, Kaiser Ventures sold off a large portion of the land to create the California Speedway (now called the Auto Club Speedway), a NASCAR-owned motorsport track.

Kaiser Ventures also intended to establish the former mine in Eagle Mountain as a landfill, but when that plan failed, it was sold to Eagle Crest Energy for a hydroelectric project.

In popular culture 
Writer Ayn Rand visited Kaiser Steel in October 1947, as part of her research for the novel Atlas Shrugged, a large part of which takes place at the fictional "Rearden Steel". The Journals of Ayn Rand include numerous items on the plant's daily routine, including both detailed technical information on the process of smelting and the terminology involved, for example: "Blast furnaces are usually named after women. The one at Kaiser's is named 'Bess' after Mrs. Kaiser and is referred to by the workers as 'Old Bess'".

Former employees of Kaiser Steel are interviewed in an episode of California's Gold with Huell Howser.

The Fontana site was the location where the steel mill scene was filmed at the end of the 1991 science fiction action film Terminator 2: Judgment Day, as well as the Outworld scenes for the 1995 movie version of Mortal Kombat.  In mid-1985, during principal photograph of A Nightmare on Elm Street 2: Freddy's Revenge, the Fontana steel mill was used to portray the abandoned electricity power plant where Freddy Krueger had taken most of his victims before his earthly death.  The site was also the location for an underground rave party in 1995 called Stargate, which thousands attended after being shuttled in from a nearby shopping center. The impact of globalization on Kaiser employees was explored in the documentary series Peoples Century.

The company has been mentioned in or the subject of many articles and books. More focused book-length accounts include John Anicic's Kaiser Steel Fontana. In 2011, a book about the rise and fall of Kaiser Steel in Fontana was published. The Steel Works, by Earle Anderson, chronicles his thirty-year career at the mill and his interactions with those who worked there from 1943 to 1984.

Rocker Sammy Hagar’s father Bobby Hagar worked at the Kaiser Steel Mill.

The smell emanating fron the plant was infamous, although people working in the area became used to it and were unaware.  A common expression with school children when someone farted was, "Eew, just like Fontana."  In fact, a degraddation of the air was noticeable around the plant and would not be allowed by today's standards.

References 

Works cited
 
 Earle Anderson, Halo Publishing, 2011, "The Steel Works"

External links 

Steel companies of the United States
Manufacturing companies based in California
Fontana, California
Henry J. Kaiser
Companies based in San Bernardino County, California
Economy of San Bernardino County, California